Gluepot may refer to:
 Gluepot, South Australia, a locality north of Waikerie
 Gluepot Reserve a private protected area after which the locality is named
Gluepot Station, a pastoral lease now used as the Gluepot Reserve.
 the Gluepot Tavern, a former live music venue in Auckland, New Zealand